HMS Swan was one of a two-vessel class of cutters built at Cowes for the Royal Navy in 1811. She had an unexceptional wartime career. After the war she served in fishery protection, and half of her entire career as a floating chapel for seamen. She was broken up in 1874.

Napoleonic Wars
Lieutenant Henry Rowed commissioned her in November 1811 for the Channel. In June 1814 Lieutenant James Whitthorn replaced Rowed, at the Nore. In August 1815 Lieutenant William Smith assumed command of Swan.

Post-war
Lieutenant James Griffiths took command of Swan in June 1817. Lieutenant Thomas Dilnot Stewart replaced Griffiths in April 1819, and stayed in command into 1822.

Lieutenant Charles Griffin assumed command in March 1823 at Sheerness. He recommissioned Swan at the Nore in March 1825. Lieutenant Joseph Webb replaced Griffin at the Nore in March 1826.

In 1827 Swan came under the command of Lieutenant Joseph Webb. Lieutenant John Goldie replaced Webb in May 1828.

In July–August 1831 Swan underwent fitting at Sheerness for service as a fishery protection vessel. Lieutenant John Lane took command in June and remained in command until 1836.

In June–July 1837 Swan became a chapel ship on the Thames for the Seamen's Home Society.

Fate
Swan was broken up at Sheerness, with the breaking up being completed on 7 December 1784.

Citations and references
Citations

References
 

1811 ships
Cutters of the Royal Navy